The Armadale line is a suburban rail service in Western Australia that runs from Perth to Armadale on the South Western Railway. This service is planned to extend to the suburb of Byford over an  new railway line constructed as part of the Byford Rail Extension project.

The Thornlie line is a service that runs on the South Western Railway from Perth to a junction between Beckenham and Kenwick and continues on a short branch line to Thornlie that opened on 7 August 2005. This service is currently, being extended to Cockburn Central (which until now was serviced by the Mandurah line only) as part of the Thornlie-Cockburn Link project that in part is constructing  of new railway line between Thornlie and Cockburn Central next to the Kewdale White Oil Line.

History 
The Armadale line runs on the South Western Railway which opened on 2 May 1893. In September 1991, the line commenced electrified operation.

Between 2004 and 2005, Armadale, Carlisle and Gosnells were upgraded to provide better facilities to passengers and provide better access between trains and buses. Lathlain station was closed on 3 February 2003 as part of the project.

Thornlie was opened on 7 August 2005. The station is built on a  spur line of the South Western Railway.

Between 21 March 1993 and 8 August 2005, trains on the Armadale line continued through Perth to the Joondalup line. In 2004 new railcars were introduced, which became exclusive to the Joondalup line. From 2005 until 2012, Armadale line trains did not run through Perth to the other lines but on 20 August 2012, as part of works relating to the Perth City Link project to sink the Fremantle line, services from Fremantle connected to the line until the tunnel was opened on 18 July 2013 which saw the Armadale line terminate in Perth again.

Victoria Park and Kelmscott Stations were upgraded between 2007 and 2008 as part of the Public Transport Authority's 'Building Better Stations' program. Victoria Park station was opened on 20 July 2008. and Kelmscott was opened on 21 November 2008.

As part of the new Perth Stadium project, Belmont Park station closed on 13 October 2013. Stadium station was opened in 2018 to replace it.

Transformation 
As part of the Metronet project, both the Armadale main line and the Thornlie spur line will undergo extensions and upgrades. Additionally, the currently combined line will be split with the Thornlie Line getting its own purple colour.

Armadale Line

Six level crossings along the Armadale Line between Kenwick and Victoria Park are being removed by elevating the railway on a viaduct. These are Mint/Archer Street, Oats Street, Welshpool Road, Hamilton Street, Wharf Street and William Street. Also, five stations will be rebuilt as new, elevated stations. These are Carlisle, Oats Street, Queens Park, Cannington and Beckenham. Welshpool station will also permanently close due to low passenger numbers and technical difficulties with the elevated viaduct passing over Welshpool Road and then under the Leach Highway bridge. By elevating the rail, new parks and public space will be created underneath the viaduct for the local community.

Armadale station will be rebuilt as an elevated station and 8 other level crossings at Armadale Road, Forrest Road, Church Avenue, Seventh Road (Pedestrian), Byron Road, Eleventh Road, Thomas Road and Larsen Road will be removed.

Thornlie Line

The Thornlie line will be extended to Cockburn Central railway station on the Mandurah line beside the Kewdale White Oil Line. Two new railway stations will be located on this extension, Nicholson Road and Ranford Road. Construction started in 2020. As part of this the track between Beckenham Junction and Thornlie station will be duplicated, including through the Kenwick Tunnel. Thornlie station will undergo significant upgrades, with extended platforms for 6-car trains and a new concourse above the tracks.

At the 2021–22 State Budget, it was announced that the Thornlie–Cockburn link had been deferred by 12 months, as a result of Western Australia's skills shortage. This was alongside the deferment of 15 other state government infrastructure projects.

On the 16th of August 2022 it was announced that the opening of these projects would be deferred to 2025 due to the pushback of the Armadale Line Shutdown.

Shutdown

From Late 2023 for 18 months, the Thornlie Line will completely close. The Armadale Line will close between Victoria Park and Armadale. The Armadale Line will continue to operate between Victoria Park and Perth, additionally calling at Burswood and Perth Stadium. This is to allow for the rebuilding of most of the lines as elevated rail to remove level crossings. This is also to facilitate works on the Thornlie-Cockburn Link and Byford Rail Extension.

The Shutdown was originally scheduled to commence in early 2023, but was pushed back to late 2023 so there would be more time for planning and design, and so there would only be impact on one AFL season instead of two.

Patronage 
Below is the annual patronage of Armadale and Thornlie lines from 2010 to 2011 financial year. Figures are provided as total boardings, which includes all fare-paying boardings and free travel on stations within the free transit zones as well as transfers between stations. The figures for rail replacement and special events services are not included in the total.

Description
During hot weather, the tracks can distort. As a result, on the Armadale and Thornlie lines, train speeds are reduced by approximately  when the air temperature is above , and by an additional  when the air temperature is above .

The Transperth network currently uses fixed block signalling and automatic train protection, which stops trains that pass a red signal and slows trains that drive too fast. These systems will be replaced by an automatic train control system, likely a communications-based train control system.

Route

Stations
During peak hour times on weekdays, some railway stations are almost always bypassed to enable faster commutes. Express trains also run along the Armadale Line on weekdays, and even often on weekends.

References

External links

Armadale and Thornlie lines
Railway lines opened in 1889
Railway lines opened in 2005
3 ft 6 in gauge railways in Australia
Railway lines in Perth, Western Australia